"Baby on Board" is the 24th episode of the third season, as well as the season finale of the American sitcom Modern Family, and the series' 72nd episode overall. It aired on May 23, 2012. The episode was written by Abraham Higginbotham and directed by Steven Levitan. The episode features guest actors Reid Ewing and Terri Hoyos.  It was viewed by 10.07 million people in its original US broadcast.

Plot
Mitchell (Jesse Tyler Ferguson) and Cameron (Eric Stonestreet) are getting ready to attend Lily's (Aubrey Anderson-Emmons) dance recital when they receive a long awaited phone call. A mother from Calexico, California chose them to adopt her baby and she is giving birth at that moment. The two of them leave Lily with Jay (Ed O'Neill) and Manny (Rico Rodriguez) to baby-sit her and take Gloria (Sofía Vergara) with them to serve as a translator since the family does not speak English. Gloria ends up feeling sick on the car ride to the hospital. When they get to the hospital they're told the baby has been born, but a chain of events lead to them not getting the baby as the grandmother of the mother finds out about it and wants to raise the baby herself. Mitch and Cameron are left very upset to have been denied a baby again after coming so close, and on the way home from the hospital the two discuss how the process has affected them and Lily. They decide to put their adoption plans on hold.

Meanwhile, Jay and Manny have to baby-sit Lily and also take her to her dance recital. Getting there, Lily does not want to go on stage and perform because her daddies are not there. Jay talks to her trying to convince her to get on stage and she agrees she will do it only under one condition: if Jay dances with her.

At the Dunphy's house, Alex (Ariel Winter) is getting ready to attend her first prom. Phil (Ty Burrell) and Claire (Julie Bowen) are excited for her, not only because she will go to her prom, but also because she is going with her new boyfriend, Michael (Joe Metcalf). When they see Michael, all the excitement goes away because they can see that he is clearly gay, only that he doesn't know it yet.

Haley (Sarah Hyland) on the other hand does not want to go her prom, something that surprises Phil and Claire. Instead she says that she will do a gap year between school and college and she will get a job and do courses, since she has not heard back from the college that put her on a waiting list. The real reason she is acting like this is because she wants to make an announcement about her plans on moving in with Dylan (Reid Ewing). That is something Claire and Phil do not like and they try to convince her that it is not a good idea. The solution comes from Luke (Nolan Gould) who has been hiding some of the family's mail including the letter of Haley's acceptance at the college that wait-listed her.

The episode ends with a cliffhanger from Gloria, who says that she was not carsick on her way to Calexico, but that she is pregnant.

Reception

Ratings
In its original American broadcast, "Baby on board" was watched by 10.07 million viewers; up 0.71 million viewers from the previous episode.

Reviews
The final episode of season 3 received critical acclaim, with some critics labelling it as one of the greatest episodes of the show thus far. Many critics laid praise on the emotional depth of Mitchell and Cameron's story, the well crafted humour and the use of a cliffhanger ending. This finale was also very well received by fans, with the episode gaining a score of 8.7 on IMDb; the highest of the season.

Donna Bowman of The A.V. Club gave a B+ grade. For the way the writers closed the show she stated: "...I don’t mind the cliffhanger at all. Not only is this a genuinely new dynamic for the show to explore [...] but it’s also presented in the context of the repetition of childhood through each succeeding stage in life.".

Leigh Raines of TV Fanatic gave a 5/5 grade saying that "Baby On Board" might have been her favorite episode of all-time. "For an Emmy-winning show that had a pretty mediocre season, I'm totally shocked to say that I think "Baby on Board" might've been my favorite Modern Family episode of all-time. It had it all. The true mark of a perfect sitcom is a show that can take you from laughing to crying in a matter of seconds - and this episode served up plenty of that. And all with a super surprising ending!"

Christine N. Ziemba of Paste Magazine rated the episode with a 9/10, closing her review with: "We liked the fact that the Modern Family writers didn’t spoonfeed us happy endings. We were in stitches one moment with Cam, Mitchell and Gloria in the hospital, watching the soap opera unfold, and in the next we were feeling their loss. We laughed and we cried in a 30-minute period. And that’s what good TV is all about."

Kristen Dyrr from Yahoo TV writes: "The "Modern Family" Season 3 finale episode "Baby on Board" is one of the best episodes of the show. The episode has it all. There are sad moments, happy moments, and twists and turns. Some of the laughs are hilarious and sad at the same time, others are both funny and creepy, and still others are cute and adorable. Every character is featured equally, so all preferences are covered. There is something for everyone."

Also, the storyline with the failed adoption of a second baby by Mitch and Cameron and the way the two actors played the scene of frustration and disappointment received positive feedback. "...Jesse Tyler Ferguson and Eric Stonestreet got to play maybe the strongest emotional material they've had in the show's run to date, and that made the episode a lot richer than we would have guessed [...] the reaction these two men had to the disappointment felt entirely earned. The scene was also maybe the purest expression of love Mitchell and Cam have ever shown one another - for all their Bickersons routine, this is an unquestionably committed couple, and it's nice to be shown that once in a while."

Accolades 
Steven Levitan received an Emmy Award for Outstanding Directing for a Comedy Series for this episode.  Ed O'Neill submitted this episode for consideration due to his nomination for the Primetime Emmy Award for Outstanding Supporting Actor in a Comedy Series at the 64th Primetime Emmy Awards.

References

External links 
 
 "Baby on Board" at ABC.com

2012 American television episodes
Modern Family (season 3) episodes
Emmy Award-winning episodes